This page details statistics of the Oceania Club Championship and OFC Champions League.

Performance

Performance by club
Past winners are:

Performance by country

Notes:
 is no longer an OFC member.

Performance by city

Participating clubs

Notes:
 is no longer an OFC member.
 is not an OFC member.

Clubs

Biggest win
 Oceania Club Championship era:
Central United  16–0 Lotoha'apai United  (20 September 1999)
Wollongong Wolves  16–0 Lotoha'apai United  (9 January 2001)
 OFC Champions League era:
Auckland City  15–0 Tupapa Maraerenga  (27 February 2019)

Highest score
 Oceania Club Championship era:
Malaita Eagles  14–2 Konica  (1999)
Central United  16–0 Lotoha'apai United  (1999)
Wollongong Wolves  16–0 Lotoha'apai United  (2001)
 OFC Champions League era:
Auckland City  15–0 Tupapa Maraerenga  (2019)

Most consecutive wins
  Auckland City – 16 (9 April 2016 – 7 April 2018)

Longest undefeated run
  Auckland City – 29 (10 May 2014 – 6 April 2019)

Most minutes without conceding a goal
  Auckland City – 1079

Players
These records are only of the Champions League era.

All-time top scorers
Preliminary Round goals not included.

Top scorers by season

Most goals in a single game
 6 goals: 
  Ross Allen (Team Wellington), 13–0 against Kiwi, group stage, 2019

Most goals in a single season
 11 goals:
  Ross Allen (2019)

Hat-tricks

Multiple Hat-tricks

Hat-tricks by team

Hat-tricks by nationality

Managers
The winning managers are:

References

External links
OFC website

OFC Champions League
International club association football competition records and statistics